Ian Simpson may refer to:

Ian Simpson (architect) (born c.1956), English architect
Ian Simpson Architects, an English architecture practice established in 1987 by Ian Simpson and Rachel Haugh
Ian Simpson (motorcycle racer) (born 1970), retired motorcycle road racer from Scotland
Ian Simpson (long jumper), British athlete and champion at the 1993 UK Athletics Championships
Ian Simpson (born 1996), American rapper and member of Brockhampton better known by his stage name, Kevin Abstract